

Early life
Dr. Ghanshyam Anuragi is a native of the Kheda Shilajit village in the district of Hamirpur, Uttar Pradesh. He was born on December 15, 1972, in the house of Mrs. Ganeshi Devi-Shri Deshraj Anuragi. Since childhood, he has been interested in reading literature and learning about new aspects of the country. The understanding that "Education is the basic foundation of life" used to amaze his child's mind. The fact is that there was no inter-college in the area around his village. Mr. Anuragi had decided in his childhood to solve this serious problem of the village society and the people of the region. 

Enthusiasts of Mr. Anuragi did not stop, even in difficult times. He wants to fulfill this public welfare resolution. He does not only want benefits for his village; the general public of the entire area should also get the benefit of education. He wants that no child in the area to be disadvantaged in education.

Higher education
He did his early education in Hamirpur district, in Acharya (MA) – Sampurnanand University Varanasi. Bachelor of Laws (LLB) – Bundelkhand University Jhansi; and Ph.D. – Sunrise University Alwar (Rajasthan).

He got a doctorate and ended his formal education journey. He always gave a special place in his life to learning and moving forward.

Political life
1995 -

The political journey of Mr. Anuragi started in 1995 when he became the village head of the village panchayat area of Kheda Shilajit. The result of his hard work during the incumbency of the village head is shown. With the government's help and the establishment of Shri Bharat Kumar Girls Inter College, arrangements were made for easy education for all in the area. Anuragi is releasing the responsibilities of the post of manager of this institution.

2000 -

Ghanshyam Anuragi's Gram Panchayat came first in the Hamirpur district. Admirable works and development by Anuragi give Gram Panchayat honored by the Uttar Pradesh government by awarding an amount of 2 lakhs. 

In the famous land of the Bundelkhand region, the fame of his struggling people's representation spread far. Due to his complete dedication and efficiency toward public service, his popularity started increasing rapidly. Because of this, in the year 2000, the public selected him as a district panchayat member from the Jalalpur district and Hamirpur area with huge votes.

At the age of 27, he also won the election of district panchayat president because of the immense love of the people. As a result of his good efforts, he decided to boost the concept of self-governance of Panchayati Raj. Mr. Anuragi was also made Vice President of the District Panchayat Committee, Uttar Pradesh.

2003-2004 -

Due to efforts to bring Veerabhoomi of Bundelkhand into the mainstream of development, the Uttar Pradesh government made him a member of the Population and Development Commission in 2003. Anuragi, who was very close to Mulayam Singh, got a ticket from the Samajwadi Party in 2004 and became a candidate for the Lok Sabha (parliamentary) constituency of Jalaun-Garautha-Bhognipur and came second by a slight difference. As it has always been seen, it is not in his nature to stop and give up, and he continued to work hard in the field and participate in the sorrows and happiness of the people.

2009 -

In the year 2009, once again, Dr. Ghanshyam Anuragi, with leadership quality, far-reaching thinking, sociable, popular, happy nature, and a good image, was selected by the people of Jalaun-Garotha-Bhognipur parliamentary constituency as a Member of the Parliament to serve the public. During his time as a parliamentary public representative, he also performed responsibilities in many parliamentary committees. Dr. Ghanshyam Anuragi was made a member of the following committees -

 Water Resources: Standing Committee
 Ministry of Steel: Consultative Committee
 Electricity: Consultative Committee
 Steel: Consultative Committee
 Committee on Subordinate Legislation
 Disaster Management Committee
 Committee on Member of Parliament Local Area Development Scheme
 General Secretary: SC/ST Parliamentary Forum

# Representing the parliamentary constituency, he solved the important issues of the Bundelkhand region. Main works are done by him  during his work as a parliamentary public representation –

 Struggled to get a 73000-crore financial aid package approved from the Center during the Bundelkhand drought. He played an important role in providing the benefits of the economic package to the region's people. 
 Doubling of the Jhansi-Kanpur railway line, electrification, upgradation of railway stations, train stoppages (Urai, Pukhraya, Month), railway overbridge on Rath Road Orai. Many far-reaching development projects benefited the people of the area.
 Kanjausa Baba's bridge on Panchnad
 Juhi's Bridge
 Bridge of Ninavali Ghat
 Maharajpura Bhimnagar bridge over the Yamuna river
 Medical College, Orai
 Kehta Chandot road bridge on Betwa River on Kalpi-Rath road
 Hemanpura – Jalalpur bridge on Kadaura Rath road
 Success in upgrading the power transformer in each Gram Panchayat
 Struggled to construct Jolhupur to Hamirpur four-lane road. He did the work to solve the serious problem of the people of the   Bundelkhand region due to the very bad condition of Jolhupur to Hamirpur road. He provides the people of the region with the benefit of smooth traffic.

Committed to the works of public service.He is always ready to keep matters of public interest in front of the top leadership, the residents of the state, and the region. He is always ready to take advantage of the government schemes run by the government to the last person in society.

2019 -

The pleasant result of Mr. Anuragi's public service and efficiency has been that in the year 2019. The President of the Bharatiya Janata Party and the state's top leadership made him a soldier of the Bharatiya Janata Party. 

He gave him an important role in the parliamentary elections of the year 2019. For the huge success of the intensive public contact campaign done by Dr. Ghanshyam Mr. Anuragi in getting the authorized candidate of Bharatiya Janata Party, Shri Bhanu Pratap Singh Verma from the parliamentary constituency Jalaun-Garautha-Bhognipur, for his efficient management in the general elections of the year 2019. The state president of the Bharatiya Janata Party highly praised it.

2021- 

In the year 2021, on the recommendation of the district and regional leadership of the district Jalaun party, the state leadership of the Bharatiya Janata Party gave him an opportunity. The opportunity includes an important role in local self-governance by providing him with an area panchayat ticket from the district panchayat area Rendhar district Jalaun. 

The residents of the area elected him as a District Panchayat member with lots of love and blessings. Anuragi is currently beautifying the post of District Panchayat President Jalaun and establishing a new paradigm of local self-governance in the Jalaun district. Mr. Anuragi is the president of the District Panchayat Organization, Uttar Pradesh, representing the District Panchayat Presidents of Uttar Pradesh.

2022 -

For the empowerment of local Panchayati Raj, given his development and commendable work in district Jalaun. He was given the national level "Pandit Deendayal Upadhyaya National Award" by the honorable Prime Minister of India. Along with this award, on April 24, 2022, the Chief Minister of Uttar Pradesh, Yogi ji, was honored with an amount of Rs 50 lakh.

Dr. Ghanshyam Anuragi's connection with the people of the Bundelkhand region, his work, and his appreciation for the people are visible everywhere. Due to his influence not only in his district but in the entire Bundelkhand region, Bundelkhand's Kaddavar is rich in people's representatives and powerful personalities.

See also

15th Lok Sabha
Lok Sabha
Politics of India
Parliament of India
Government of India
Bharatiya Janata Party
Jalaun (Lok Sabha constituency)  

Social Media Accounts link --

https://www.instagram.com/dr.ghanshyamanuragi/

https://www.facebook.com/profile.php?id=100071100211491

https://twitter.com/MpAnuragi

India MPs 2009–2014
Bharatiya Janata Party
Lok Sabha members from Uttar Pradesh
People from Jalaun
People from Jalaun district
Sampurnanand Sanskrit Vishwavidyalaya alumni
Samajwadi Party politicians
1972 births
Living people